The pentanes are a group of alkanes with five carbon atoms with the formula C5H12. It has three isomers.

References 

Alkanes
Hydrocarbon solvents